William Roger Revelle (born c. 1944) is a psychology professor at Northwestern University working in personality psychology. Revelle studies the biological basis of personality and motivation, psychometric theory, the structure of daily mood, and models of attention and memory.

Early life and education
Revelle was raised in La Jolla, California. His father, Roger Revelle, was an early theorist in global warming.

Revelle graduated from Pomona College in 1965, abandoning a mathematics major in favor of psychology. He spent two years in Sarawak, Malaysia, as a volunteer in the Peace Corps before earning his PhD in psychology from the University of Michigan in 1973. He became a member of the Northwestern Faculty in 1973.

Career
Revelle has previously served as the President (2005-2009) of the International Society for the Study of Individual Differences (ISSID), the President (2008-2009) of the Association for Research in Personality (ARP), and the President (1984) of the Society of Multivariate Experimental Psychology (SMEP).

Currently, he is vice-chair of the Governing Board of the Bulletin of the Atomic Scientists, having previously served as Chair (2009-2012).  He also serves as the President (2018–present) of the International Society for Intelligence Research (ISIR).

Additionally, he is a Fellow of the American Association for the Advancement of Science (AAAS; 1996–present), the Association for Psychological Science (APS; 1994–present), the American Psychological Association (APA Division 5; 2011–present), and the Society for Personality and Social Psychology (SPSP; 2015–present).

He resides in Evanston, Illinois.

Bibliography

Selected publications

Software

References

External links
Home page
Lab website
Faculty Profile at Northwestern University
Social Psychology Network Profile

21st-century American psychologists
Living people
Northwestern University faculty
1940s births
Pomona College alumni
University of Michigan alumni
Personality psychologists
Quantitative psychologists
20th-century American psychologists